Joel Norman Quenneville (born September 15, 1958) is a Canadian–American ice hockey coach and former player in the National Hockey League (NHL).  Nicknamed "Coach Q", he is second in NHL coaching wins at 969 behind Scotty Bowman. Quenneville achieved his greatest success as head coach of the Chicago Blackhawks, whom he led to three Stanley Cup titles between 2010 and 2015. His championship victory in 2010 was the Blackhawks' first since 1961, ending the then-longest Stanley Cup drought. He also served as the head coach of the St. Louis Blues from 1996 to 2004, the Colorado Avalanche from 2005 to 2008, and the Florida Panthers from 2019 to 2021.

Playing career
As a player, Quenneville was drafted 21st overall by the Toronto Maple Leafs in the 1978 NHL Entry Draft. A defenceman, he played for the OHA's Windsor Spitfires, the New Brunswick Hawks, Baltimore Skipjacks and St. John's Maple Leafs of the American Hockey League (AHL), and the Maple Leafs, Colorado Rockies/New Jersey Devils, Hartford Whalers and Washington Capitals of the NHL. He has also been a player/assistant coach of St. John's, head coach of the AHL's Springfield Indians, and assistant coach of the Quebec Nordiques and Colorado Avalanche.

Coaching career

St. Louis Blues
Quenneville won the Stanley Cup as an assistant coach with the Avalanche in 1996. He then moved to the St. Louis Blues franchise, becoming head coach midway through the next season after Mike Keenan was fired. He led St. Louis to seven straight playoff berths. His best season was in 1999–2000, when he led the Blues to a franchise-record 51 wins and their first Presidents' Trophy for the league's best regular season record. However, they were upset in the playoffs, losing to the San Jose Sharks in the first round. In Quenneville's 2004 season with the Blues, the team started poorly and late in the year was in danger of missing the playoffs for the first time in a quarter century. As a result, Quenneville was fired.

Colorado Avalanche
Quenneville was hired to coach the Avalanche in June 2004, before the 2004–05 NHL lockout resulted in the season's cancellation. In his first year with the Avalanche, he led the team to the playoffs and a first round upset of the Dallas Stars. On March 25, 2007, Quenneville coached his 750th career game. He became one of only seven currently active coaches to reach 750 games as of the 2006–07 season. Quenneville coached his 400th win on October 26, 2007, a 3–2 overtime game against the Calgary Flames. On May 9, 2008, the Avalanche announced that Quenneville was leaving the organization. Quenneville was hired as a pro scout by the Chicago Blackhawks in September 2008.

Chicago Blackhawks
On October 16, 2008, Quenneville was promoted to head coach of the Chicago Blackhawks, replacing former Blackhawk Denis Savard. On December 1, 2009, he received his 500th win as a coach in an 11-round shootout battle against the Columbus Blue Jackets. In his first two seasons with Chicago, he led the team to the 2009 Western Conference Final and the 2010 Stanley Cup Finals. With the Blackhawks' victory over the Philadelphia Flyers in the latter, Quenneville earned his first Stanley Cup as a head coach. On December 18, 2011, he earned his 600th career coaching win, winning 4–2 against the Calgary Flames. Quenneville earned his second championship as a head coach against the Boston Bruins during the 2013 Stanley Cup Finals, cementing his status as one of a handful of Chicago head coaches with multiple championships (the others are George Halas of the Chicago Bears, Phil Jackson of the Chicago Bulls, and Frank Chance of the Chicago Cubs). On March 19, 2014, Quenneville became just the third head coach in NHL history to record 700 wins. On March 23, 2015 Quenneville reached 750 wins as a coach.

His team won the Stanley Cup for the third time on June 15, 2015 with a 2–0 shutout over the Tampa Bay Lightning. This was the first Blackhawks' championship win on home ice since 1938. With his third win, Quenneville became the third coach in Chicago sports history to win three championships, after Halas and Jackson. On January 14, 2016, Quenneville earned his 783rd win, passing Al Arbour for second all-time among NHL coaches. On April 3, 2016, Quenneville earned his 800th win, in a 6–4 victory over the Boston Bruins, and joined Scotty Bowman as the only two coaches with at least 800 wins.

On February 21, 2017, the Blackhawks defeated the Minnesota Wild 5–3, helping Quenneville become the second coach in Blackhawks history to win 400 games. On February 21, 2018, Quenneville became the third coach in NHL history to coach 1,600 games as the Blackhawks won 3–2 over the Ottawa Senators. On March 10, Quenneville coached in his 1,608th regular season game and passed Arbour for second most on NHL all-time games coached list. On November 6, 2018, the Blackhawks fired Quenneville after a 6–6–3 start in the 2018–19 season. He concluded his tenure in Chicago with a 452–249–96 regular season record, a 76–52 record in the postseason, and as the second winningest coach in NHL history with 890 wins. His 452 wins are second in Blackhawks history behind only Billy Reay, and only Reay had a longer unbroken tenure with the team.

Florida Panthers
On April 8, 2019, the Florida Panthers hired Quenneville as head coach. In his first season with the Panthers, Quenneville led the Panthers to a 35–26–8 record in the pandemic-shortened 2019–20 season and the Panthers' first playoff appearance in four seasons, losing to the New York Islanders in four games in the qualifying round. In the 2021–22 season, Quenneville led the Panthers to a 7–0–0 record through the team's first seven games. 

However, on October 26, 2021, an independent investigation into how the Blackhawks responded to claims that former video coach Brad Aldrich sexually assaulted prospect Kyle Beach during the 2010 Stanley Cup playoffs revealed that Quenneville and the rest of the Blackhawks' senior leadership team opted to defer any action on Aldrich until after the Stanley Cup Finals. According to the report, Quenneville was particularly concerned about causing a distraction before the Finals. Aldrich was allowed to quietly resign after the Finals, and subsequently pleaded guilty to assaulting a player at a Michigan high school where he was a volunteer coach. Quenneville had previously claimed he had no knowledge of Aldrich's misdeeds before Beach and the high school player sued the Blackhawks, but multiple witnesses stated that he was called into a meeting to discuss the Aldrich matter shortly after the Blackhawks defeated the Sharks to advance to the 2010 Finals.

On October 27, 2021, Quenneville was summoned to a meeting the following day with NHL Commissioner Gary Bettman to discuss his role in the incident. Within hours of that meeting, Quenneville announced his immediate resignation as Panthers coach. According to a formal NHL statement, Bettman, the Panthers, and Quenneville mutually agreed that "it was no longer appropriate" for Quenneville to stay on. Bettman also announced that Quenneville will have to meet with him before he is allowed to work in the NHL again.

Career statistics

Playing statistics

Coaching record

 Season shortened due to the COVID-19 pandemic during the 2019–20 season. Playoffs were played in August 2020 with a different format.

Personal life
Quenneville is of Franco-Ontarian heritage and is married to Elizabeth, a native of Connecticut whom he met during his stint with the Hartford Whalers. They reside in Coral Springs, Florida with their three children: a son, Dylan, and two daughters, Lily and Anna. After working in the U.S. for over 30 years, Quenneville passed the USCIS naturalization test required to become a United States citizen on May 24, 2011, and now has dual citizenship.

Quenneville was hospitalized and reported as being "in stable condition after 'severe discomfort' of a non-cardiac nature" on February 16, 2011, resulting in him missing a home game versus the Minnesota Wild that night. After a conversation with the coach, Kelly Chase reported that Quenneville had suffered from internal bleeding, the cause of which was yet to be discovered, but that he was in high spirits and intended to be behind the bench for the Blackhawks next game on February 18. It was announced on February 18, that the problem had been a small ulcer caused by aspirin, a drug known to have the potential for gastrointestinal side effects. He finally returned to take the Blackhawks practice on February 23, having been released from the hospital on February 19.

See also
 List of NHL head coaches
 List of NHL coach statistical leaders

References

External links
 
 Profile at hockeydraftcentral.com

1958 births
Baltimore Skipjacks players
Canadian emigrants to the United States
Canadian ice hockey coaches
Canadian ice hockey defencemen
Chicago Blackhawks coaches
Chicago Blackhawks players
Colorado Avalanche coaches
Colorado Rockies (NHL) players
Franco-Ontarian people
Hartford Whalers players
Ice hockey people from Ontario
Ice hockey player-coaches
Jack Adams Award winners
Living people
New Brunswick Hawks players
New Jersey Devils players
Quebec Nordiques coaches
Sportspeople from Windsor, Ontario
St. John's Maple Leafs players
St. Louis Blues coaches
Stanley Cup champions
Stanley Cup championship-winning head coaches
Toronto Maple Leafs draft picks
Toronto Maple Leafs players
Washington Capitals players
Windsor Spitfires players